Swedish hip hop artist Yung Lean, has released seven studio albums, six EPs and three mixtapes.

Albums

Studio albums

Collaborative albums

Compilation albums

Live albums

Mixtapes

Demotapes

Extended plays

Singles

As lead artist

As featured artist

Other charted songs

Music videos

As lead artist

As featured artist

Guest appearances

Production discography

2017 
Huncho Jack – Huncho Jack, Jack Huncho
 08. "Dubai Shit" (co-produced by Vinylz, OZ and Yung Gud)

References

Discographies of Swedish artists
Hip hop discographies